Lindomar Ferreira da Silva (born September 1, 1982) is a Brazilian footballer.

External links
 Atlanta Silverbacks profile

1989 births
Living people
Brazilian footballers
Brazilian expatriate footballers
Atlanta Silverbacks players
Expatriate footballers in Spain
Expatriate soccer players in the United States
North American Soccer League players
Association football defenders